Palitsi Reservoir is a reservoir the village of Palitsi, Elena Municipality, Bulgaria.

This reservoir is part of the Stara Planina mountain range, approximately 10 km east of the town of Elena. The waters of the lake are bred with carp, white fish and perch, which makes it suitable for fishing.

The lake offers excellent conditions for vacations, recreation, camping, picnics, walks in nature, water sports and sunbathing.

Reservoirs in Bulgaria
Landforms of Veliko Tarnovo Province
Tourist attractions in Veliko Tarnovo Province